The 2012–13 season was St Mirren's seventh consecutive season in the Scottish Premier League, having been promoted from the Scottish First Division at the end of the 2005–06 season. St Mirren also competed in the League Cup and the Scottish Cup.

Summary

Season
St Mirren finished eleventh in the Scottish Premier League. They reached the Quarter-final of the Scottish Cup, and won the League Cup for the first time in the club's history, beating Heart of Midlothian 3–2 in the Final.

Results and fixtures

Pre season

Scottish Premier League

Scottish League Cup

Scottish Cup

Squad information

Captains

Players
Last updated 18 May 2013

|}

Disciplinary record
Includes all competitive matches. 
Last updated 18 May 2013

Team statistics

League table

Division summary

Transfers

Players in

Players out

See also
List of St Mirren F.C. seasons

References 

St Mirren F.C. seasons
St Mirren